Abdulla Al-Qamish (Arabic:عبد الله القميش) (born 27 March 1993) is an Emirati footballer. He currently plays as a goalkeeper for Dibba Al-Hisn.

Career

Al-Nasr
Al-Qamish started his career at Al-Nasr and is a product of the Al-Nasr's youth system.

Hatta
On 19 July 2017 left Al-Nasr and signed with Hatta . On 30 November 2017, Al-Qamish made his professional debut for Hatta against Al-Wasl, replacing Obaid Raihan in the Pro League .

Dibba Al-Fujairah
On 4 June 2018 left Hatta and signed with Dibba Al-Fujairah . On 1 March 2018, Al-Qamish made his professional debut for Dibba Al-Fujairah against Al Dhafra in the Pro League.

References

External links
 

1993 births
Living people
Emirati footballers
Al-Nasr SC (Dubai) players
Hatta Club players
Dibba FC players
Dibba Al-Hisn Sports Club players
UAE Pro League players
UAE First Division League players
Association football goalkeepers
Place of birth missing (living people)